Rocksmith supports a DLC store where users may purchase new songs, in-game pedals, and in-game amplifiers. Bass guitar functionality was added to the North American version of the game via downloadable content on August 14, 2012. All DLC songs are forward-compatible with Rocksmith 2014, but DLC songs released on or after October 22, 2013, are compatible only with Rocksmith 2014 and will not play on the original version of Rocksmith.

The three songs no longer available for download for users who don't already own them are those included in the "Holiday 3-Song Pack".

Almost all songs are available to buy individually. Songs by the same artist are often available as "Song Packs", which include three or more songs, for a discounted price.

The final DLC to be released was released in March 2020, as Ubisoft San Francisco transitions to a new project. As of November 2021, the DLC for the original Rocksmith is slowly getting removed from digital storefronts as the licensing agreements for the songs expire.

References

Rocksmith